Hugo Lundevall (7 December 1892 – 16 January 1949) was a Swedish swimmer. He competed in the men's 100 metre backstroke event at the 1912 Summer Olympics.

References

External links
 

1892 births
1949 deaths
Olympic swimmers of Sweden
Swimmers at the 1912 Summer Olympics
Swimmers from Stockholm
Swedish male backstroke swimmers
20th-century Swedish people